Dwayne Stukes (born January 24, 1977) is an American football coach and former defensive back. He was most recently the special teams coordinator for the Denver Broncos of the National Football League. He was previously an assistant special teams coach for the Chicago Bears and Los Angeles Rams.

Professional playing career
Stukes was signed by the Atlanta Falcons as an undrafted free agent in 2000. He played college football at Virginia. He spent parts of four seasons in the NFL from 2000 to 2003 as a member of the Atlanta Falcons, Pittsburgh Steelers, and the Tampa Bay Buccaneers. Stukes also played in NFL Europe on the Berlin Thunder (2001-2002) and in the Arena Football League on the Colorado Crush).

Coaching career
Stukes was hired by the Jacksonville Jaguars as a defensive assistant on February 21, 2019. Stukes assumed Jason Rebrovich's defensive line coaching duties for team's week 11 game in 2020 against the Pittsburgh Steelers due to Rebrovich missing the game for COVID-19 pandemic protocols.

On February 23, 2021, the Los Angeles Rams announced Stukes as an assistant special teams coach. Stukes won Super Bowl LVI when the Rams defeated the Cincinnati Bengals.

On February 18, 2022, Stukes was hired by the Denver Broncos to serve as the team's special teams coordinator for the 2022 season.

Personal
Stukes and his wife, Lori have three children: two daughters and a son.

References

1977 births
Living people
Virginia Cavaliers football players
Berlin Thunder players
Tampa Bay Buccaneers players
Colorado Crush players
Berlin Thunder coaches
Tampa Bay Buccaneers coaches
Chicago Bears coaches
Players of American football from Virginia
Sportspeople from Portsmouth, Virginia
New York Giants coaches
Jacksonville Jaguars coaches
Dallas Cowboys coaches
Denver Broncos coaches